Undercover Boss is a 2011 Norwegian reality television series, based on the British series of the same name. Each episode depicts a person who has a high management position at a major business, deciding to become undercover as an entry-level employee to discover the faults in the company. The first series premiered on 8 March 2011 with the CEO of the grocery store chain Rimi.

Format 
Each episode features a high-ranking executive or the owner of a corporation going undercover as an entry-level employee in their own company. The executives alter their appearance and assume an alias and fictional back-story. The fictitious explanation given for the accompanying camera crew is that the executives are being filmed as part of a documentary about entry-level workers in a particular industry. They spend approximately one week undercover, working in various areas of their company operations, with a different job and in most cases a different location each day. They are exposed to a series of predicaments with amusing results, and invariably spend time getting to know the people who work in the company, learning about their professional and personal challenges.

At the end of their week undercover, the executives return to their true identity and request the employees they worked with individually to corporate headquarters. The bosses reveal their identity, and reward hard-working employees through campaign, promotion, or financial rewards, while other employees are given training or better working conditions.

Episodes 
The first series featured 10 episodes. The series premiered on 8 March 2011 and concluded on 10 May 2011.

Series 1: 2011

References

External links 
 

Undercover Boss
2011 Norwegian television series debuts
2011 Norwegian television series endings
2011 Norwegian television seasons
2010s Norwegian television series